Swizzels Matlow Limited, branded as Swizzels, is a confectionery manufacturer based in New Mills, Derbyshire, near Stockport in the United Kingdom. The company had revenues of £47 million in 2010/11. It employs around 600 people. Swizzels Matlow exports 20 per cent of its sweets to more than 20 countries, mostly in Europe. Their highest selling brands are Love Hearts, Parma Violets and Drumstick lollies. Its biggest sales period is Halloween.

History 

Operations began in the early 1920s at a market stall in Hackney, London, with Maurice and Alfred Matlow selling jellied sweets. They built a small factory in east London in 1928 and became known as Matlow Brothers, producing jellies and chews. In 1933 the firm merged with a rival factory owner, David Dee, who specialised in fizzy compressed tablet sweets (although the company officially became Swizzels Matlow Ltd only in 1975).

In 1940, the Blitz forced their business to relocate northwards to a disused wick factory in New Mills, Derbyshire, where it remains. Parma Violets were introduced in 1946. Love Hearts were introduced in 1954. Drumsticks were introduced in 1957.

Hydrogenated fats were phased out in 2004. Artificial flavourings were discontinued in 2009.

Products

Refreshers 

Refreshers are one of Swizzels' most popular products. These are flat chewy sweets with sherbet in the middle, available in lemon and strawberry flavours. They are officially named New Refreshers, to avoid trademark confusion with Barratt's compressed tablet Refreshers sweet.

Fizzers 

Fizzers are rolled-up tablet candies that fizz and dissolve when put into soda. They are similar to the American candy Smarties (called Rockets in Canada). Swizzels Matlow has also released a line of Giant Fizzers.

Parma Violets 

Parma Violets are disc-shaped sweets similar to Fizzers but all lilac coloured with an almost 'scenty' taste and no fizziness.  Swizzels Matlow has also released a line of Giant Parma Violets.

Drumstick products 

The Drumstick sweet is a chewy lolly about 2" (5 cm) in length. It features two flavours, milk and raspberry. It has had many special editions, such as the still produced lime and orange flavour. Drumsticks are now vegan. 

In 2012, Swizzels Matlow launched "Drumstick Squashies", foam-like chewy sweets with the same flavour as the Drumstick lolly. Several flavour variations, such as bubblegum, have also been released. 

In 2020, Swizzels released a Drumstick Chocolate Bar. It consists of milk chocolate with a raspberry and milk flavour filling with freeze-dried raspberry pieces. Unlike the Drumstick Squashies, the chocolate bar is suitable for vegetarians.

Others 

Products include:
 Banana Skids
 Climpies
 Double Lollies
 Fruity Pops
 Fun Gums
 Mr Chews
 Rainbow Dust
 Rainbow Drops
 Love Hearts
 Double Dip
 Tango Orange Flavour Chew Bar
 Stinger Tutti-Fruiti Flavour Chew Bar
 Crystal Fruits

References

External links 
 
 

Food and drink companies established in 1928
Companies based in Derbyshire
Confectionery companies of the United Kingdom
1928 establishments in England
New Mills